Periya Nagapoondi is a panchayat village located in Tiruvallur district of Tamil Nadu, India. Per 2001 census, the population of the village was 1,571.

See also
 Chinna Nagapoondi

References

Cities and towns in Tiruvallur district